Amikam is a moshav in northern Israel. Located near Zikhron Ya'akov, it falls under the jurisdiction of Alona Regional Council, whose headquarters are located in the moshav. West of the moshav is the Alona Park.

History
The moshav was established in 1950 by Jewish refugees from Harbin, Manchuria and Shanghai, China, who had fled the Chinese Civil War. The land had belonged to the depopulated Palestinian village of Sabbarin.

The founders were later joined by Jews from the Cyprus concentration camps, and followed by Yemenite Jews. In 1956, a group of Polish Jewish immigrants settled on the moshav. Some of the families engage in fruit farming, raising peaches, plums, nectarines and loquats. Children attend the local Tali Alona elementary school.

Agriculture
A rare variety of peach was grown on Moshav Amikam and named for the moshav. Pits from this variety were found on Masada. Now the one remaining tree is in Kfar Kara.

Notable residents
Yoav Galant (born 1958), Israeli Minister of Defense and former army general

References

External links

Weekend Walk: Moshav Amikam
Mey Kedem, archaeological site centered on a Roman water tunnel

Moshavim
Populated places established in 1950
Populated places in Haifa District
Chinese diaspora in Israel
Chinese-Jewish diaspora
Cypriot diaspora
Polish-Jewish culture in Israel
Yemeni-Jewish culture in Israel
1950 establishments in Israel